The 1900 Ole Miss Rebels football team represented the University of Mississippi during the 1900 Southern Intercollegiate Athletic Association football season. Led by Z. N. Estes in his first and only season as head coach, the team lost all three of its contests and played no home games.

Schedule

References

Ole Miss
Ole Miss Rebels football seasons
Ole Miss Rebels football